Covington High School is a public secondary school in Covington, Virginia, United States.  It is part of Covington City Public Schools and is located on 530 South Lexington Avenue.

School Information
Covington High School is the sole high school for Covington City in the Alleghany Highlands, and is one of the smallest high schools in Virginia.  Unlike most larger school districts whose high schools enroll 9th-12th graders, Covington holds students from the 8th grade through 12th grade.

Demographics
Covington High School in 2014-2015 was 79% White; 20% Black, and 5% Asian, 5% Hispanic.

Enrollment History

Test scores
Covington High School is a fully accredited high school based on the Standards of Learning tests in Virginia.

Athletics
The mascot is a Cougar and the sports teams currently play in the A Pioneer District and Region C.  The Cougars have won two state titles in football, the 1942 Class B state championship and the 1984 Virginia High School League Group A state championship.

Before 1984, Covington was an AA school participating in the AA Blue Ridge District.

Notable alumni

Linton Townes (born 1959), basketball player

References

Public high schools in Virginia
Buildings and structures in Covington, Virginia
School buildings on the National Register of Historic Places in Virginia
National Register of Historic Places in Covington, Virginia